Émilie Thuillier is a politician in Montreal, Quebec, Canada. She has served on the Montreal city council since 2009, representing Ahuntsic as a member of Projet Montréal, and has been a member of the Montreal executive committee since November 2012.

Early political career
Thuillier holds a bachelor's degree in Geography from the Université de Montréal and a master's degree in sciences and the environment from the Université du Québec à Montréal. She became a founding member of Projet Montréal in 2004 while writing her master's thesis on urban sustainable development. Not long thereafter, she was chosen as the party's vice-president.

She first sought election to the Plateau-Mont-Royal borough council in the 2005 Montreal municipal election, running in the De Lorimier division. The returns office initially declared her elected by twelve votes, but the final scrutiny showed that she was defeated by nine. Had she won, she would have been only the second representative of her party elected anywhere in the city. After the campaign, she became a leading Projet Montréal spokesperson and press attaché to its leader, Richard Bergeron.

Thuillier later ran for Montreal city council in a 2008 by-election in Ahuntsic. She finished third against Vision Montreal's Hasmig Belleli.

City councillor
Thuillier ran in Ahuntsic again in the 2009 municipal election and was elected in a close three-way contest; one of her opponents was former provincial cabinet minister Diane Lemieux. Gérald Tremblay's Union Montreal won a majority on council and served as the governing party for the next three years, initially with Vision Montreal and Projet Montréal as junior coalition partners and later on its own.

Tremblay resigned as mayor in November 2012 amid the backdrop of a serious corruption scandal. He was replaced by Michael Applebaum, who formed a coalition government with representation from all parties on council and some independents. Applebaum announced his executive committee on November 22, 2012, appointing Thuillier to one of two vice-chair positions, with responsibility for social and community development, family, seniors, youth and the status of women. In June 2013, she helped organize a safety campaign for the benefit of seniors living in social housing.

Applebaum, in turn, resigned as mayor in June 2013. His successor, Laurent Blanchard, re-appointed Thuillier to the same executive positions.

By virtue of her position on city council, Thuillier is also a member of the Ahuntsic-Cartierville borough council.

In the 2017 municipal election, Thuillier ran to replace Pierre Gagnier of Équipe Coderre, who was not seeking reelection. She ultimately defeated Équipe Coderre stalwart Harout Chitilian to win the position.

Electoral record

References

External links
Municipal biography (in French), City of Montreal

Living people
Montreal city councillors
People from Ahuntsic-Cartierville
Women municipal councillors in Canada
21st-century Canadian politicians
21st-century Canadian women politicians
Mayors of places in Quebec
Year of birth missing (living people)
Women mayors of places in Quebec